Wild Honey is a 1984 adaptation by British playwright Michael Frayn of an earlier play by Anton Chekhov. The original work, a sprawling five-hour drama from Chekhov's earliest years as a writer, has no title, but is usually known in English as Platonov, after its principal character "Mikhail Platonov", a disillusioned provincial schoolmaster.

Frayn's adaptation was given its first production at London's National Theatre in 1984 and won Olivier Awards in three categories: for Ian McKellen as Actor of the Year in a Revival, Christopher Morahan as Director of the Year and John Gunter as Designer of the Year. "Anna Petrovna" was played by Charlotte Cornwell.

The play opened at New York's Virginia Theatre in December 1986 presented by impresario Douglas Urbanski with McKellen repeating his title role, but otherwise with an American cast which included Kim Cattrall, Kathryn Walker and Kate Burton.

The play was broadcast as a radio play on the digital radio station, BBC7 on 31 January 2010 as part of a BBC radio season of documentaries, drama, short stories and essays to celebrate the 150th anniversary of Chekhov's birthday. Ian McKellen returned to play Platonov, while Anna Calder Marshall played Sasha. BBC Radio 4 broadcast another production in 2018, directed by Clive Brill, starring David Tennant as Platonov and Olivia Darnley as Sasha.

References

External links
 The 1984 London production
 Photographs from the 1986 New York production

1984 plays
Plays based on works by Anton Chekhov
Plays by Michael Frayn